Simona Staicu (born 5 May 1971 in Băileşti, Romania) is a Romanian-born Hungarian long-distance and marathon runner. Transferring her allegiance from Romania in 2000 to compete internationally for Hungary, Staicu has won numerous titles in the half-marathon, and has attained a personal best of 2:29:59 at the Milano City Marathon in Milan, Italy. Staicu trains under the tutelage of her husband, coach, and former runner András Juhász, as a member of the track and field team, at Budapesti Vasutas Sport Club in Budapest.

Staicu qualified for the Hungarian team, as a 33-year-old, in the women's marathon at the 2004 Summer Olympics in Athens. She registered an IAAF A-standard and a 2004 seasonal best of 2:36:46, following her victory at the Osaka Marathon in Japan. Staicu finished the race with a forty-fifth place time in 2:48:57 from a vast field of 83 marathon runners, just twelve seconds slower than her entry standard.

References

External links

1971 births
Living people
Hungarian female long-distance runners
Hungarian female marathon runners
Olympic athletes of Hungary
Athletes (track and field) at the 2004 Summer Olympics
Hungarian people of Romanian descent
People from Băilești
Athletes from Budapest
Hungarian female cross country runners
Romanian female cross country runners
Romanian female marathon runners
Romanian female long-distance runners
World Athletics Championships athletes for Hungary